Upon This Rock may refer to:

The phrase "Upon this rock I will build my church", taken from the Confession of Peter in the Gospel of Matthew.

Film 

Upon This Rock (film), a 1970 British film starring Dirk Bogarde
Upon This Rock (Heroes), an episode of the US TV series Heroes

Music 

Upon This Rock (Larry Norman album), a 1969 album by Larry Norman
Upon This Rock (Joe Farrell album), a 1974 album by Joe Farrell
 "Upon This Rock," a track by Sandi Patty from her 1983 LP, Live: More Than Wonderful
Upon This Rock (band), a Christian rock band from Purcell, Oklahoma

Other 

 Upon This Rock is a series of SF novels by David Marusek